Ayan is a 2009 Indian Tamil-language action thriller film co-written and directed by K. V. Anand. The film, starring Suriya, Prabhu, Tamannaah, Akashdeep Saighal, Jagan, and Karunas, was produced by M. Saravanan, M. S. Guhan, Aruna Guhan and Aparna Guhan and distributed by Sun Pictures. The film score and soundtrack was composed by Harris Jayaraj, edited by Anthony Gonsalvez, the film was filmed by M. S. Prabhu.

The film was launched in Chennai, while filming also took place in various locations out of India, including Namibia, Malaysia, Zanzibar and South Africa. It released on 3 April 2009 worldwide to positive reviews. Ayan was declared as the solo blockbuster of 2009 in Tamil cinema, collecting about  worldwide. The film was also successful in Kerala.

Plot 
Deva is a post-graduate Computer Science student in Chennai, who works with Dass by smuggling pre-release unlicensed movies on DVD and other small contrabands mainly through the air. Deva's widowed mother Kaveri does not appreciate his choice of career. Their former business associate Nemichand Seth's son Kamalesh  tries to foil their Diwali film piracy operations, as a means of taking over that smuggling deal for himself through police-backed channels. After the raid on their hideout orchestrated by Kamalesh, Dass is offered a deal by the inspector that one of his men should take the blame for the crimes. Deva attempts to do so, but another man, Chitti Babu, who had no affiliation with the gang, takes the blame.

Later, Chitti joins Dass's group and befriends Deva, and Deva completes his education. Chitti and Deva run a variety of smuggling jobs for Dass for months, often on international routes. Chitti learns of all the means and modes of operations. Meanwhile. Deva meets Chitti's younger sister Yamuna inadvertently, and they soon fall in love. On Deva's birthday, he and Chitti smuggle out gold bars worth $150 million from a tanked ship in Chennai port. When Dass learns of Deva's birthday, he gives him the day off to enjoy, while the others will trade the gold. Deva is called for a temple worship by his mother where trouble ensues when he learns that, in the midst of a major smuggling operation, the customs authorities have been tipped off to the hideout, but the others have narrowly escaped with the goods. He finds out that Chitti has been working for Kamalesh all this while.

Chitti goes on to work as a drug mule for Kamalesh, ingesting heroin capsules and transporting them to Malaysia. He meets Deva on the flight. While disembarking, Chitti falls ill and Deva fends off Kamalesh's gang to help Chitti even though they were estranged. Chitti confesses that although he worked for Kamalesh, his friendship with Deva was genuine. In a tragic turn of events, Chitti is kidnapped by Kamalesh's gang before Deva can save him, and they cut him up to recover the drugs. Deva fends off the thugs and tries to save Chitti. In his final moments, Chitti requests Deva to burn him so that his family never learn of his death. Deva burns Chitti, along with the drugs and returns to India with Chitti's belongings, but Kamalesh tips off the authorities about Chitti's death, and Yamuna herself files a case against Deva.

However, Yamuna finds Chitti's phone, in which Chitti had recorded the circumstances of his death. Deva is let off, and Yamuna reunites with him. Deva plans to stay away from the smuggling business for a while, but Kamalesh has his people plant drugs at the airport and blames it on Deva where he tips off the customs officer Parthiban. Deva, in turn informs Parthiban about the drug mules working for Kamalesh in exchange for his freedom. Deva works with Parthiban to monitor Kamalesh's calls with his clients, busting many illegal consignments. Kamalesh eventually discovers the bug and tries to eliminate Deva and Parthiban. However, they both escape and secure a massive cocaine shipment from Kamalesh. Despite this, they trace the shipment to Kamalesh's accountant, who agrees to become a witness.

Kamalesh has the accountant killed before the court hearing and is let off for lack of evidence. Kamalesh tries to kill Deva and his mother, but they have a narrow escape. He then plans a hit on Dass and Deva to take control of their diamond smuggling operation. Dass saves Deva but is killed in the process. Deva heads to Congo where he kills Kamalesh and retrieves the diamonds. When he returns to India, Parthiban searches him again, admitting that Deva's mother had exposed him to get Deva out of his illegal activities. Deva surrenders the diamonds, and Parthiban reveals that he can now enlist Deva to work as a customs official. Deva accepts the job and walks out with his mother and Yamuna.

Cast 

 Suriya as Devaraj Velusamy (Deva), a post graduate in computer science and involved in smuggling to help his father's friend Dass.
 Prabhu as Dass, a local smuggler who starts with Kamalesh's father. Later become number one.
 Tamannaah as Yamuna, Chitti's sister, and Deva's love interest (Voice dubbed by Chinmayi)
 Akashdeep Saighal as Kamalesh, Dass's business enemy who later kills him, dubbed by Ajay Kapoor
 Jagan as Chitti Babu, Deva's friend and later revealed to be Kamalesh's spy in Dass' group who later dies.
 Karunas as Dilli, Dass's driver, who is hearing impaired.
 Ponvannan as J. Parthiban IRS, the customs officer and the Assistant Commissioner of the Income Tax-Air Intelligence Unit.
 Renuka as Kaveri Velusamy, Deva's mother, who does not approve of his affairs with Dass.
 Delhi Ganesh as Narcotics Officer
 Subhalekha Sudhakar as Film Producer
 Janaki Sabesh as Kamalesh's aide at the airport and the bar
 Kalairani as Brothel Owner
 Boys Rajan
 Koena Mitra as an item number in Honey Honey
 Raghuvaran as Velusamy, Deva's father (Photo only)

Production

Development 
Three years after the release of his debut venture Kana Kandaen starring Srikanth and Gopika, cinematographer K. V. Anand expressed his desire to commence his second film as director. He and Subha discussed several plots and settled for "Ayan" because "it was not only different but had scope for entertainment". It was later announced that Anand would be directing his next film, produced under the AVM Production banner, titled Ayan. The film was inaugurated at AVM Studios on 24 March 2008 with the presence of most of the unit members. On the occasion, Anand announced the film's genre to be an action thriller interlaced with romance and comedy. He also suggested Ayan meant "outstanding", excellence" or can be the name for sun rays in five different languages. However, this was later doubted by a few critics, raising a point saying Ayan was not necessarily a Tamil language word. Despite the film's lyricist Vairamuthu's calls for the word to be a Tamil word, it was argued that Ayan was a nickname for the Hindu deity Lord Brahma. Since the word was then touted to be borrowed from the Sanskrit language, the film was prone to a title change, in light of Tamil Nadu's Entertainment Tax Exemption Act, which was passed in 2006. A similar problem was faced by the producers of Aegan, which was also under production at the time. The controversy was later dropped. Ayan was announced to be predominantly set in various locations of both South Asia and Africa. It was made at a production cost of 200 million.

Casting
K. V. Anand announced the film with both Suriya and Tamannaah to play the lead roles in the film. Surya was initially expected to play the lead role in Anand's earlier film but was not able to do so. Anand expressed his thoughts during the film's inauguration that "Surya was apt for the title role" since the film's title meant "sun rays" and the name "Surya" refers to the sun. Ayan would also make Surya's second film with AVM Productions, after their previous partnership in Perazhagan. Furthermore, Surya had worked with Anand since Surya's debut in the 1997 film Nerukku Ner for which Anand was the film's photographer. Surya's physique was key for his character, as he would be acting as a powerful and active youngster. During the film's launch, he announced that he would give the film his best, understanding the nature of the producers, who previously presented the big-budget film Sivaji. Tamanna, after starring in the Tamil films Kalloori (for which she was nominated for a Filmfare Award) and Padikathavan, was cast in Ayan. Prabhu was consecutively cast in Ayan in a pivotal role, as per his previous films, in which he played important supporting characters. It was later announced that Anand would introduce a new actor to Tamil cinema in the film, who will be playing a negative role, which was later known to be Akashdeep Saighal, who predominantly works in Bollywood films.

Apart from the film's cast, the film's crew consisted of Harris Jayaraj as the composer along with Vairamuthu, Pa. Vijay and Na. Muthukumar as the lyricists. M. S. Prabhu was chosen as the film's cinematographer, who is a friend of Anand and worked with him under the guidance of P. C. Sriram.

Filming
Nenje Nenje’ song was shot on the sand dunes of the Namib-Naukluft National Park, Dune 7 and Dead Vlei in Namibia, in freezing temperature. Songs were composed in Mauritius, where William Honk choreographed the car chase shots. The stunt sequences were shot at Binny Mills with a huge set resembling an airport while another fight was shot at Cape Town, Africa. The filming was also held at Kuala Lumpur, Malaysia, Botswana, Zimbabwe and Zanzibar.

Themes and influences
The film dealt with the concept of smuggling and custom officers. In order to prepare the script, Anand did a lot of research and is said to have spoken to a lot of custom officers to understand the modus operandi of smuggling.

Music

The film's soundtrack is composed by Harris Jayaraj, in his fourth collaboration with Suriya, after Kaakha Kaakha, Ghajini and Vaaranam Aayiram, and his first collaboration with director K. V. Anand. Harris composed all the songs in Mauritius. The film's audio launch took place on 19 January 2009, at the office of Sun TV Network in Chennai, with the presence of the film's cast and crew. The audio launch had a live telecast on Sun Music. The film features six tracks, with lyrics written by Na. Muthukumar, Vairamuthu and Pa. Vijay.

The film was dubbed into Telugu as Veedokkade, and its soundtrack was released on 22 February 2009.

Reception

The soundtrack album received mostly positive reviews from music critics as well as listeners. Behindwoods gave the album 3 out of 5 stating, "Harris Jayaraj’s crafting is elegant as ever. But what disappoints us here slightly is that the songs have influences of his earlier albums here and there, which could have been avoided. Harris does have it in him to give us many more ‘wah wah’ numbers." Indiaglitz gave the album 2.75 out of 5 and stated, "'Ayan' has a whole lot of mix in spellbinding melodies and mind-boggling peppy numbers. Undoubtedly, Harris is there over the top with the prodigious score for his ducky actor Surya." Rediff gave the album 2.5 out of 5 stating, "Harris Jeyaraj wants to break away from his usual melodies and try something new. And he has succeeded, to a certain extent. Barring one or two numbers, this effort doesn't seem to sustain itself after the first few lines, but perhaps, with repeated listening, its appeal might increase."

Release
The satellite rights of the film were secured by Sun TV. The film was given a "U/A" certificate by the Indian Censor Board. AVM Productions sold the film's distribution rights for Tamil Nadu to Sun Pictures for  200 million.

Reception

Critical reception
The film received highly positive reviews from critics, upon release.
Malathi Rangarajan of The Hindu wrote: "Ayan is Suriya’s show all the way. He bears the onus with a smile and the death-defying stunts add to the robust image he aims to project". 
Behindwoods wrote: "Ayan is fun. Just buy a huge bag of popcorn, a can of cola, and have a blast! But do remember the first step about the logic". Indiaglitz wrote: "Though the storyline is familiar and oft-seen in the past, the pacy narration and captivating visuals provide the necessary pep to the film". Sify rated 3 out of 5 stars stating "Paisa Vasool". Rediff rated 3.5 out of 5 stars stating "Ayan is definitely a must-watch."

Box-office
International distribution rights were sold to Ayngaran International. The film's Telugu dubbed version, Veedokkade, was sold to Hyderabad based producer, Bellamkonda Suresh.
The film ran over 100 days in Kerala. The Telugu dubbed version Veedokkade ran over 100 days in Andhra Pradesh.

Awards
Ayan received the most nominations at the 57th Filmfare Awards South (12) and the 4th Annual Vijay Awards (18).

References

External links 
 
 
 

2009 films
2009 action thriller films
Films shot in Malaysia
Films about organised crime in India
2000s Tamil-language films
Films shot in Namibia
Films shot in South Africa
Films shot in Tanzania
Films shot in Zimbabwe
Films shot in Botswana
Films shot in Mauritius
Films shot in Chennai
Films shot in Kuala Lumpur
Indian action thriller films
AVM Productions films
Films set in the Democratic Republic of the Congo
Films about mining
Blood diamonds
Parkour in film
Films scored by Harris Jayaraj
Films with screenplays by Subha
Films about the Narcotics Control Bureau
Films about the illegal drug trade
Films directed by K. V. Anand